Cymindis heydeni is a species of ground beetle in the subfamily Harpalinae. It was described by Paulino De Oliveira in 1882.

References

heydeni
Beetles described in 1882